In mathematics, the domain of a function is the set of inputs accepted by the function.

Note that in modern mathematical language, the domain is part of the definition of a function rather than a property of it.

In this case, the domain is represented on the -axis of the graph, as the projection of the graph of the function onto the -axis.

For a function , the set  is called the codomain, and the set of values attained by the function (which is a subset of ) is called its range or image.

Any function can be restricted to a subset of its domain.

Natural domain 
If a real function  is given by a formula, it may be not defined for some values of the variable. In many contexts, a partial function is called simply a function, and its natural domain is called simply its domain.

Examples 

 The function  defined by  cannot be evaluated at 0.
 The piecewise function  defined by  has as its natural domain the set  of real numbers.

Other uses 

The term domain is also commonly used in a different sense in mathematical analysis: a domain is a non-empty connected open set in a topological space. In particular, in real and complex analysis, a domain is a non-empty connected open subset of the real coordinate space  or the complex coordinate space 

Sometimes such a domain is used as the domain of a function, although functions may be defined on more general sets. The two concepts are sometimes conflated as in, for example, the study of partial differential equations: in that case, a domain is the open connected subset of  where a problem is posed, making it both an analysis-style domain and also the domain of the unknown function(s) sought.

Set theoretical notions 
For example, it is sometimes convenient in set theory to permit the domain of a function to be a proper class , in which case there is formally no such thing as a triple . With such a definition, functions do not have a domain, although some authors still use it informally after introducing a function in the form .

See also 
 Argument of a function
 Attribute domain
 Bijection, injection and surjection
 Codomain
 Domain decomposition
 Effective domain
 Image (mathematics)
 Lipschitz domain
 Naive set theory
 Range of a function
 Support (mathematics)

Notes

References 
 
 
 
 
 
 

Functions and mappings
Basic concepts in set theory